The following lists events that happened in 1902 in El Salvador.

Incumbents
President: Tomás Regalado Romero
Vice President: Francisco Antonio Reyes

Events

References

 
El Salvador
1900s in El Salvador
Years of the 20th century in El Salvador
El Salvador